Florence Mall may refer to:
 Florence Mall (Alabama), formerly Regency Square Mall, in Florence, Alabama
 Florence Mall (Kentucky), in Florence, Kentucky
 Florence Mall, a former mall in Florence, South Carolina